Hristo Dimitrov Koilov (born 23 September 1969) is a Bulgarian former professional footballer who played as a midfielder.

Career
On the club level, Koilov played for Botev Plovdiv, CSKA Sofia, Lokomotiv Sofia, FC Luzern and 1. FC Union Berlin. For Berlin club Union he played from 1999 to 2003, when he was in the successful team that surprisingly reached the German cup final in May 2001 and afterwards the second round of the UEFA Cup.

He played his last match in his career on 13 June 2009 with Lokomotiv Sofia against Slavia Sofia.

In 1993 Koilov earned his first and only cap with Bulgaria national team.

References

External links
Official profile at PFC Lokomotiv Sofia's website. 

Bulgarian footballers
1969 births
Living people
First Professional Football League (Bulgaria) players
Botev Plovdiv players
PFC CSKA Sofia players
FC Lokomotiv 1929 Sofia players
FC Luzern players
1. FC Union Berlin players
Expatriate footballers in Germany
Expatriate footballers in Switzerland

Association football midfielders
Bulgaria international footballers